The 1933 Tampico hurricane was one of two storms in the 1933 Atlantic hurricane season to reach Category 5 intensity on the Saffir-Simpson Hurricane Scale. It developed on September 16 near the Lesser Antilles, and slowly intensified while moving across the Caribbean Sea. Becoming a hurricane on September 19, its strengthening rate increased while passing south of Jamaica. After weakening, it made landfall on the Yucatán Peninsula, destroying several houses. One person was killed offshore Progreso, Yucatán during the storm.

Over land, the hurricane weakened to a tropical storm, although it re-intensified slightly in the Gulf of Mexico. Damage was heaviest there, estimated at $5 million (1933 USD) and there were hundreds of deaths. About 75% of the houses in Tampico were damaged, including about 50% of houses that had severe to total destruction to their roofs. The destruction prompted the declaration of martial law, and there was a curfew instated.

Meteorological history

A tropical disturbance moved westward across the tropical Atlantic Ocean in mid-September. After entering the Caribbean Sea, the depression intensified into a tropical storm on September 18, and a day later it became a hurricane. On September 20 it passed to the south of Jamaica while quickly strengthening.

After peaking in intensity, the hurricane continued to the northwest. Its landfall intensity was unknown; the Atlantic hurricane reanalysis in 2012 suggested that the storm could have retained Category 5 status until landfall, although local observations did not validate the theory. It quickly reintensified into a hurricane while moving toward the northeast Mexican coastline. Within 12 hours, the storm dissipated over land.

Impact
While passing south of Jamaica, the hurricane produced high surf in Kingston. Heavy rains from the storm affected much of the island, which disrupted travel and caused one mudslide. In Cozumel offshore the Yucatán Peninsula, winds reached  from the southeast. There, the hurricane destroyed a fishing pier and several houses. Offshore Progreso, the storm capsized a boat, killing one person.

Before the hurricane made its final landfall, the threat of heavy rainfall prompted evacuations around Tampico, just 10 days after another hurricane hit the same region. High winds cut power lines and blew off or heavily damaged the roofs of half of the city's houses. A high accompanying storm surge washed away many people from their homes, and several barges were washed away. The harbor was filled with debris after the storm, rendering it unusable. According to news reports, the hurricane damaged about 75% of Tampico. Majority of the damage was to poorly constructed houses, although a large hospital in Tampico was also destroyed, killing 87 people. Roads were blocked throughout the city, and the river was closed to boating. The rail line was impacted, which disrupted relief supplies from reaching the region. Outside of the city, the hurricane increased levels along the Pánuco and Tamesí rivers, which remained above flood stage for several days. West of Tampico, the hurricane flooded the entire city of Cárdenas, San Luis Potosí, killing 20 and injuring 200 people. In Pánuco, Veracruz, about 5,000 people were left homeless. In San Luis Potosí state, 30 people were killed when a dam burst. Heavy rainfall in Monterrey caused rivers to flood. Damage spread as far as the west coast of Mexico. Throughout the country, air travel was disrupted, and several train lines were washed out, leaving three trains missing.

Initial news reports suggested a death toll of up to 5,000 people, and the storm was considered "the greatest disaster in recent Mexican history". Two days after the storm dissipated, the death toll was set at 54, with 850 people injured and potentially thousands that were buried. Search and rescue teams dug through the debris of the Tampico to find survivors and victims. In 1997, the National Hurricane Center listed the death toll between 184–200, and damage was estimated at $5 million (1933 USD).

In the aftermath of the storm, food and medical supplies rapidly diminished. After the storm dissipated, doctors and nurses traveled to the city to assist in the aftermath, while trains carried food and water. A train from Monterrey to Tampico carried food, medicine, and soldiers to assist in rebuilding, but was delayed by ongoing flooding. Military planes were utilized to transport aid. Martial law was declared in Tampico following the storm, and officials imposed a 7 p.m. curfew. Uninjured citizens helped clear the roads. President Abelardo L. Rodríguez asked the governors of the Mexican states to send aid and for residents to send money to the Bank of Mexico. Following the storm, residents overcrowded the buildings that remained standing in Tampico.

See also

 List of Atlantic hurricanes
 List of Category 5 Atlantic hurricanes
 Hurricane Gilbert (1988) – A destructive Category 5 hurricane that took a similar track
 Hurricane Emily (2005) – Another destructive Category 5 hurricane that took a similar track
 Hurricane Dean (2007) – Another destructive Category 5 hurricane that took a similar track

Notes

References

Category 5 Atlantic hurricanes
1933 Atlantic hurricane season
Atlantic hurricanes in Mexico
1933 in Mexico
1933 in the Caribbean